Philippe Muller (born 20 April 1946, in Mulhouse) is a French cellist.

Biography 
Philippe Muller (born April 20, 1946 in Mulhouse) is a French cellist and pedagogue.

His first contact with the cello was under the guidance of Dominique Prete, professor at the National School of Music and soloist with the philharmonic orchestra of his native city.

His parents, although passionate about music, did not initially think of making him a professional musician, but they did not oppose his desire to attend the Paris Conservatoire.

With André Navarra, his mentor, Philippe Muller realized the importance of methodical and well-organized work. The years he spends in his class prepare the basis for his own teaching. Guy Fallot and Paul Tortelier will complete his training.

Philippe Muller has devoted an important part of his career to chamber music. For a long time principal cello of the Versailles Chamber Orchestra, he founded in 1970 a trio with Jean-Jacques Kantorow and Jacques Rouvier, which rapidly acquired great national and international renown. In 1976, he joined the Ensemble Intercontemporain where he became familiar with the music of his time. He stayed there for seven years.

In 1979 he was appointed Professor of cello at the most prestigious Conservatoire de Paris, succeeding his teacher André Navarra. A leading figure of the French cello school, he was passionate about teaching and for thirty-five years trained a large number of students, many of whom became renowned soloists. In 2014, reaching retirement age, he emigrated to the United States and accepted a teaching position at the Manhattan School of Music in New York City.

Aside from his teaching duties, he is also frequently invited to serve as a jury member for the most prestigious international cello competitions, f.e. Concours de violoncelle Rostropovitch, International Paulo Cello Competition, Grand Prix Emanuel Feuermann, Pablo Casals International Cello Competition, Isang Yun Competition, George Enescu International  Competition, Beijing International Music Competition. In order to maintain a balance between classes and concerts, he performs as a soloist as often as possible and collaborates with numerous ensembles. He is a regular guest in major European, American and Asian cities.

His extensive discography, begun in the seventies, reflects his eclectic tastes and his love of chamber music.

Famous cellists having studied  with Philippe Muller 

Sophia Bacelar, Emmanuelle Bertrand, Gautier Capuçon, Marc Coppey, Blaise Déjardin, Bruno Delepelaire, Henri Demarquette, Katharina Deserno, Ophélie Gaillard, Anne Gastinel, Alexander Gebert, Christian-Pierre La Marca, Éric & Yan Levionnois, Hee-Young Lim, Dimitri Maslennikov, Edgar Moreau, Kenji Nakagi, Pablo de Naveran, Aurélien Pascal, Jérôme Pernoo, Romain Garioud, Xavier Phillips, Raphaël Pidoux, François Salque, Camille Thomas, Dominique de Williencourt, Sung-Won Yang, William Molina Cestari, Johan van Iersel.

Discography 

Vivaldi: Six sonatas for Cello and Harpsichord Op. 14 (with Klaus Preis), Da Camera Magna
Mozart: Quartets with flute (with András Adorján, Pina Carmirelli, Philipp Naegele), Sastruphon
Ludwig van Beethoven: Serenades (avec Pina Carmirelli, Philipp Naegele), Impromptu
Johann Sebastian Bach: The musical Offering (with András Adorján, Johannes Nerokas, Bernd Krakow, Masafumi Hori, Maria Fülöp, Philipp Naegele, Jürgen Wolf), Sastruphon, 1972
Bohuslav Martinu, Maurice Ravel: Duets for violin and cello (with Pina Carmirelli), Da Camera Magna, 1972
Johann Sebastian Bach: The Art of the Fugue (with Pina Carmirelli, Maria Fülöp, Philipp Naegele), Sastruphon, 1973
Bohuslav Martinu: Cello Sonatas (with Ralf Gothoni), Da Camera Magna, 1975
Cello and Organ (with Rolf Schönstedt), Da Camera Magna, 1976
Paganini, Boccherini: Guitare Chamber Music (with Rudolf Wangler, Philipp Naegele, Jean-Claude Bouveresse, Marjan Karuza), Da Camera Song, 1976
The Art of the Cello (with Brigitte Haudebourg, Jacques Rouvier, Henri Wojtkowiak, Paul Tortelier), Arion, 1979
Bohuslav Martinu, Works for Cello 2 (with Ralf Gothoni), Da Camera Magna,1979
Jacques Offenbach : Cello Duets (with Alain Meunier), 1980
Gabriel Fauré, César Franck: Works for Cello and Piano (with Jacques Rouvier), Harmonia Mundi, 1982
Michel Merlet: Chamber Music (with Jean-Jacques Kantorow, Pascal Devoyon), Cybelia, 1983
Guy Ropartz: Sonatas for cello and piano (with Monique Bouvet), Oybella, 1989
Igor Stravinsky: Florence Gould Hall Chamber Players (with Pierre-Henri Xuereb, Jean-Louis Haguenauer, Michel Lethiec, Annick Roussin, Alexis Galperine, Fabrice Pierre, Patrick Gallois), OPES 3D, 1993
Jacques Castérède: Trois paysages d'Automne (with Atelier Musique Ville d'Avray, conductor: Jean-Louis Petit), REM, 1999
Ivo Malec: Arco-I, Motus, 1999
Johan Sebastien Bach: The 6 Suites for cello solo, Passavant Music, 2008
Jean Cras: Chamber Music (with Shikiko Tsuruzono, Akiko Nanashima, Jacques Gauthier), Fontec, 2012

In a trio with Jean-Jacques Kantorow and Jacques Rouvier

 Dmitri Shostakovich, Bohuslav Martinu: Twentieth century trios, Da Camera Magna, 1971
 Maurice Ravel: Trio for piano, violon, cello / Sonata for violon and cello, Erato, 1975
 Johannes Brahms: Trio n°1, Opus 8 in B for piano, violin and cello, Sarastro, 1977
 Beethoven: The Archduke Trio Opus 97, Accord, 1978
 Johannes Brahms: Trios opus 87 (C major), opus 101 (C minor) , Accord, 1979
 Hans Pfitzner: Trio in F minor Opus 8 for piano, violin and cello, Da Camera, 1980
 Franz Schubert: Trio Opus 99, Forlane, 1982
 Franz Schubert: Trout Quintet Opus 114, (with Vladimir Mendelssohn and Duncan Mc.Tier), Forlane, 1982
 Debussy, Ravel, Fauré: Trios for piano, violin and cello, Denon, 1993

With the Heidelberg Chamber Orchestra

 Antonio Vivaldi: Concertos for cello, Sastruphon
 George-Philipp Telemann: Triple concerto in B flat major, concert in G major, concert suite in D major, Da Camera Magna, 1974

Within l'Octuor de Paris

Franz Schubert: Octet in F, Opus 166 (with Jean-Pierre Laroque, Guy Deplus, Gabin Lauridon,Daniel Bourgue, Jean-Louis Bonafous, Gérard Klam, Jean Léber), CGD, 1978

Within l'Ensemble Intercontemporain

 Maurice Ravel : Chansons madécasses (with Jessye Norman, Alain, Marion, Pierre-Laurent Aimard), 1979
 Arnold Schoenberg: The Transfigured Night, Op.4 (with Charles-André Linale, Maryvonne Le Dizès, Jean Sulem, Garth Knox, Pierre Strauch)

References

External links 
www.cellist.nl database 

Musicians from Mulhouse
1946 births
Living people
French classical cellists
Academic staff of the Conservatoire de Paris
20th-century French musicians
21st-century French musicians
20th-century cellists
21st-century cellists